Dominik Dvorak (born 1987), known by their stage name felicita (stylized in all lowercase), is a London-based record producer and DJ. Felicita came to prominence through early collaborations with Nabihah Iqbal, Palmistry and Sophie. In 2014, they released the Frenemies EP with Gum Artefacts on digital platforms and vinyl.

They have worked with A. G. Cook under the collaborative alias Lipgloss Twins on the PC Music label and in early 2016, they were officially signed to PC Music as a solo act. They released the A New Family EP in October 2016 on the label. Felicita's debut album hej! was released on 3 August 2018.

Career

Early years and breakthrough
Felicita first received praise from music magazines and blogs in 2013 for the (>'.')># EP and the single "Chlo/Bring It". In 2014, the then-anonymous collaborative project Lipgloss Twins released the single "Wannabe" on PC Music to significant coverage. Later that year Frenemies, their first commercial EP, was released on Gum Artefacts to positive reviews from Pitchfork and Resident Advisor.

2015–2017: Work with PC Music
After two self-released singles in 2015 that were promoted by PC Music, a string of live performances at PC Music events and showcases, and another release from Lipgloss Twins, Felicita's signing to the label was announced with the single "heads will roll / i will devour you" in May 2016. The single "a new family" was released with a music video directed by artist and frequent collaborator Matt Copson in October, and it was followed by an EP of the same name. Felicita and Copson also presented a 'A Woodland Truce' at the Serpentine Sackler Gallery, London featuring Marcus Nasty and Musarc. In March 2017, Felicita released the EP Ecce Homo, closely followed by a mix for the magazine Dazed. Felicita also composed the OST for the movie DRIB starring Brett Gelman, which premiered at SXSW 2017.

2017–present: Hej!
In December 2017, "Soft Power" - the collaborative performance between Felicita and the Polish traditional dance ensemble Śląsk - was brought to London for the first time. The collaboration was first performed at Unsound Festival, Kraków in 2016 and later performed at the Barbican Centre in London. Felicita and Estonian rapper TOMM¥ €A$H embarked on a European tour together in April 2018, and in May, Cash released "Little Molly", a track produced by felicita, A. G. Cook, and Tommy himself.

On 2 February 2018 at the Arizona State University Art Museum, felicita and Matt Copson debuted an "interdisciplinary project to restore an ancient animatronic doll". The artists worked and performed with the Phoenix Children's Choir as a part of the project. On 3 July 2018, felicita announced their debut album Hej! - named after its lead single which was released with a music video on 6 December 2017. The announcement was accompanied by the release of the album's second single and music video "Marzipan", which features vocals from Caroline Polachek and interpolates the traditional Polish lullaby "Był sobie król". Hej! was released on 3 August 2018 via PC Music.

Personal life
Felicita is half Polish. They attended The School of Oriental and African Studies in London and speaks fluent Mandarin Chinese. Felicita identifies as non-binary and uses they/them pronouns.

Discography

Albums
 Hej! (2018)

EPs
 (>'.')># (2013)
 Frenemies (2014)
 A New Family (2016)
 Ecce Homo (2017)

Singles

Music videos

Remixes

Guest appearances

Production credits

References

Living people
British record producers
English electronic musicians
Musicians from London
1987 births
English people of Polish descent
PC Music artists
LGBT record producers
Non-binary musicians
Transgender musicians
English LGBT musicians
Transgender non-binary people